The Curse of Company are a Sydney based indie rock band formed by David "Wiley" Rennick from the internationally celebrated Australian band Dappled Cities.

Members
The band is a sort of Australian indie super-group comprising many successful indie artists:
Wiley Rennick (vocals, guitar) aka Dave Rennick – Dappled Cities
Sarah Kelly (vocals) – theredsunband
Danny Heifetz (drums) – Mr Bungle and Secret Chiefs 3
Burke Reid (co-producer/engineer) – Gerling
Jack Ladder (bass) – Expatriate

History
They released an album entitled "Leo Magnets Joins a Gang" in 2008.  It was released by ABC Music in Australia and by the indie label Dangerbird Records in America.
Their debut single "All The Mines" received airplay on the national broadcaster Triple J.

Notes

External links 
 

Australian indie rock groups
Dangerbird Records artists